This is a list of all cricketers who have played first-class, List A or Twenty20 cricket for the Northern Districts cricket team in New Zealand. Seasons given are first and last seasons; the player did not necessarily play in all the intervening seasons.

A

 Kyle Abbott, 2018/19
 Gren Alabaster, 1960/61–1962/63
 Charles Aldridge, 1977/78–1978/79
 Graeme Aldridge, 1998/99–2014/15
 Leslie Andersen, 1967/68
 Corey Anderson, 2011/12–2018/19
 Peter Anderson, 1977/78–1979/80
 Robert Anderson, 1969/70
 Cody Andrews, 2014/15–2015/16
 Simon Andrews, 2000/01–2007/08
 Brent Arnel, 2000/01–2017/18

B

 John Bailey, 1965/66
 Mark Bailey, 1989/90–2001/02
 James Baker, 2010/11–2020/21
 Murray Baker, 1974/75
 Rowan Barbour, 1959/60
 Brian Barrett, 1986/87–1989/90
 Peter Barton, 1962/63–1974/75
 Hugh Barton, 1957/58
 Bryan Bayley, 1961/62–1964/65
 Derek Beard, 1987/88–1990/91
 Don Beard, 1961/62–1964/65
 Terence Beatson, 1971/72
 Matthew Bell, 1993/94–1996/97
 Dion Bennett, 1996/97
 Keir Bettley, 2010/11
 John Beuth, 1962/63–1969/70
 Travis Birt, 2014/15
 John Blackmore, 1968/69–1972/73
 Bruce Blair, 1984/85–1985/86
 David Blake, 1992/93
 Trevor Blake, 1964/65
 Peter Bocock, 2016/17–2020/21
 Jono Boult, 2008/09–2016/17
 Trent Boult, 2008/09–2019/20
 Tony Boyle, 1986/87
 Brendon Bracewell, 1983/84–1989/90
 Grant Bradburn, 1985/86–2001/02
 Wynne Bradburn, 1955/56–1968/69
 Aaron Bradley, 1993/94–1994/95
 Roger Bradley, 1990/91
 Roger Broughton, 1980/81–1986/87
 Dean Brownlie, 2014/15–2019/20
 Graham Burnett, 1993/94–1994/95
 Terence Burns, 1964/65
 Ian Butler, 2001/02–2007/08

C

 Lance Cairns, 1981/82–1987/88
 Chris Cairns, 1988/89
 Roland Calland, 1977/78
 Mark Carrington, 1981/82–1986/87
 John Carson, 1967/68–1968/69
 Robert Carswell, 1957/58
 Joe Carter, 2013/14–2020/21
 Ellis Child, 1953/54–1958/59
 Murray Child, 1975/76–1986/87
 Rory Christopherson, 2013/14–2014/15
 Don Clarke, 1953/54–1962/63
 Douglas Clarke, 1957/58–1960/61
 Katene Clarke, 2019/20–2020/21
 Tamati Clarke, 2012/13
 Allen Collier, 1976/77
 Richard Collinge, 1975/76–1977/78
 Barry Cooper, 1980/81–1995/96
 Henry Cooper, 2016/17–2020/21
 Desmond Crene, 1966/67
 Lindsay Crocker, 1982/83–1988/89
 Steven Croft, 2012/13
 Bob Cunis, 1975/76–1976/77
 Paul Curtin, 1980/81

D

 Nathan Daley, 1999/00–2003/04
 Sean Davey, 2017/18
 Te Ahu Davis, 2004/05–2008/09
 Colin de Grandhomme, 2018/19–2020/21
 Richard de Groen, 1990/91–1995/96
 John Derrick, 1986/87
 Anton Devcich, 2004/05–2019/20
 Cliff Dickeson, 1973/74–1986/87
 Tillakaratne Dilshan, 2009/10
 Robbie Diver, 1997/98–2000/01
 David Donald, 1957/58–1960/61
 Jason Donnelly, 2010/11–2011/12
 Simon Doull, 1989/90–2001/02
 William Duncan, 1957/58
 Brian Dunning, 1961/62–1980/81

E
 Alun Evans, 2004/05–2006/07
 James Everest, 1953/54–1956/57

F

 Luke Feldman, 2013/14
 Rene Ferdinands, 1998/99
 Desmond Ferrow, 1956/57–1957/58
 Matthew Fisher, 2019/20
 Cam Fletcher, 2012/13–2013/14
 Daniel Flynn, 2004/05–2019/20
 James Foster, 2012/13
 Brian Foulds, 1969/70–1970/71
 Bill Fowler, 1979/80–1984/85
 Jeff Freeman, 1972/73–1975/76
 Roddy Fulton, 1973/74–1976/77

G

 Shane Gadsdon, 2008/09
 Herschelle Gibbs, 2010/11
 Grant Gibson, 1968/69–1980/81
 Jake Gibson, 2019/20
 Zak Gibson, 2015/16–2019/20
 Gary Giles, 1961/62–1975/76
 Brian Gill, 1969/70
 Stu Gillespie, 1979/80–1982/83
 Eric Gillott, 1971/72–1978/79
 Tony Goodin, 2012/13–2016/17
 Bernard Graham, 1953/54–1956/57
 Douglas Gray, 1954/55–1959/60
 Rod Griffiths, 1975/76–1980/81
 John Guy, 1964/65–1972/73

H

 Brett Hampton, 2011/12–2019/20
 Kim Hancock, 1985/86–1986/87
 Malcolm Harding, 1986/87
 Dent Harper, 1958/59
 Daniel Harris, 2013/14–2014/15
 Stuart Harris, 1975/76
 Matthew Hart, 1990/91–2004/05
 Robbie Hart, 1992/93–2003/04
 Norman Harwood, 1959/60
 Brook Hatwell, 2010/11–2011/12
 Jaden Hatwell, 2001/02–2003/04
 Philip Havill, 1969/70
 Roydon Hayes, 1991/92–1995/96
 Graeme Hick, 1987/88–1988/89
 Jono Hickey, 2012/13–2014/15
 Bryan Higgins, 1953/54–1956/57
 Brandon Hiini, 2011/12
 Edwin Hipkiss, 1966/67
 Roneel Hira, 2016/17
 Paul Hodder, 1986/87
 Brad Hodge, 2010/11
 Peter Holland, 1978/79
 William Holt, 1964/65
 Brett Hood, 2000/01
 Rex Hooton, 1968/69–1971/72
 Gareth Hopkins, 1995/96–1997/98
 Nick Horsley, 2002/03–2007/08
 Martin Horton, 1967/68–1970/71
 David Hoskin, 1954/55–1964/65
 Ken Hough, 1955/56–1956/57
 Alan Hounsell, 1974/75
 Geoff Howarth, 1974/75–1985/86
 Llorne Howell, 2004/05
 David Hussey, 2010/11

I
 Gareth Irwin, 2002/03
 Owen Ivins, 2010/11

J
 Mark Jefferson, 2006/07
 Chris Jordan, 2017/18–2018/19

K

 David Kelly, 2002/03
 Nick Kelly, 2014/15–2018/19
 Kevin Kennedy, 1964/65–1974/75
 Ross Kneebone, 1992/93
 Sebastian Kohlhase, 1963/64
 Chris Kuggeleijn, 1975/76–1990/91
 Scott Kuggeleijn, 2013/14–2020/21

L

 Sean Lambly, 1993/94–1994/95
 Maurice Langdon, 1955/56–1964/65
 Ben Laughlin, 2013/14–2017/18
 Trent Lawford, 2016/17
 Jamie Lee, 2003/04
 Jeff Leigh, 1977/78
 Brad Leonard, 2005/06–2006/07
 Allen Lissette, 1953/54–1962/63
 Dennis Lloyd, 1968/69–1980/81
 Nicholas Lloyd, 1990/91

M

 John McFarlane, 1964/65
 Rex McGill, 1970/71–1971/72
 Peter McGlashan, 2004/05–2011/12
 Peter McGregor, 1962/63–1963/64
 Grant McKenzie, 1983/84–1990/91
 Mark McKinnon, 1983/84–1988/89
 Stu McLaggan, 1973/74
 John McLeod, 1970/71–1971/72
 Ross McPherson, 1959/60–1970/71
 Hamish Marshall, 1998/99–2011/12
 James Marshall, 1997/98–2012/13
 Bruce Martin, 1999/00–2009/10
 Terence Masters, 1969/70
 Andrew Mathieson, 2010/11
 Dennis Matthews, 1963/64
 Russell Mawhinney, 1985/86–1986/87
 Matthew Maynard, 1990/91–1991/92
 Cameron Merchant, 2007/08–2008/09
 Daryl Mitchell, 2011/12–2019/20
 John Mitchell, 1964/65–1966/67
 Richard Morgan, 1991/92–1993/94
 Lance Mountain, 1967/68–1973/74
 Gary Murphy, 1973/74

N

 Dion Nash, 1990/91–1997/98
 Tarun Nethula, 2018/19
 Peter Neutze, 1989/90

O

 Kevin O'Brien, 2014/15–2015/16
 Alex O'Dowd, 1996/97–1997/98
 Mark Orchard, 2001/02–2007/08
 Brendon Oxenham, 1990/91–1992/93

P

 Bruce Pairaudeau, 1958/59–1966/67
 John Parker, 1972/73–1983/84
 Michael Parlane, 1992/93–2010/11
 Neal Parlane, 1996/97–2000/01
 Adam Parore, 1994/95–1995/96
 Dhiru Patel, 1971/72
 Robin Penhearow, 1963/64–1975/76
 Eric Petrie, 1953/54–1966/67
 Blair Pocock, 1992/93–1996/97
 Michael Pocock, 1965/66
 Neil Pollock, 1981/82–1986/87
 Bharat Popli, 2013/14–2019/20
 Dean Potter, 1991/92–1992/93
 Michael Poultney, 1972/73
 Craig Presland, 1982/83–1984/85
 Ashok Puna, 1971/72–1972/73
 Kirti Puna, 1975/76–1978/79
 Tom Puna, 1956/57–1968/69

R

 Brett Randell, 2016/17–2019/20
 Jeet Raval, 2020/21
 Nathan Reardon, 2016/17
 Andrew Roberts, 1967/68–1983/84
 Barry Roberts, 1977/78
 Grant Robinson, 2001/02–2007/08
 Gerald Rose, 1967/68
 Craig Ross, 1989/90–1996/97

S

 Mitchell Santner, 2011/12–2019/20
 Clifton Satherley, 1959/60–1960/61
 Hector Schuster, 1965/66–1971/72
 Bradley Scott, 2008/09–2012/13
 Steve Scott, 1978/79–1985/86
 Tim Seifert, 2014/15–2019/20
 Adam Seymour, 1994/95
 Terence Shaw, 1956/57–1963/64
 Mike Shrimpton, 1974/75
 Ryan Shutte, 2004/05–2005/06
 Amandeep Singh, 2005/06
 Peter Skelton, 1957/58
 Jim Smith, 1967/68–1971/72
 Kingsley Smith, 1993/94
 Peter Smith, 1953/54–1956/57
 Ish Sodhi, 2012/13–2020/21
 Addil Somani, 1988/89–1993/94
 Tim Southee, 2006/07–2020/21
 Jason Spice, 1993/94–1996/97
 Brian Spragg, 1987/88–1988/89
 Michael Stephens, 1993/94
 Gerald Stewart, 1968/69
 Alan Stimpson, 1974/75–1978/79
 Peter Stone, 1961/62–1968/69
 Andrew Strauss, 2007/08
 Scott Styris, 1994/95–2014/15
 Murphy Su'a, 1988/89–1989/90
 Bert Sutcliffe, 1962/63–1965/66

T

 Alex Tait, 1992/93–2000/01
 Graeme Tarr, 1957/58–1958/59
 Geoffrey Taylor, 1973/74–1974/75
 Shane Thomson, 1987/88–1996/97
 David Tidmarsh, 1992/93
 Karl Treiber, 1979/80–1987/88
 Chris Tremain, 2013/14
 Daryl Tuffey, 1996/97–2012/13
 John Turnbull, 1953/54–1959/60
 Glenn Turner, 1976/77
 Roger Twose, 1989/90

U
 Hira Unka, 1968/69–1975/76

V

 Timm van der Gugten, 2015/16
 Stuart Veitch, 1960/61–1966/67
 Anurag Verma, 2011/12–2019/20
 Daniel Vettori, 1996/97–2014/15

W

 Neil Wagner, 2018/19–2020/21
 Freddy Walker, 2016/17–2018/19
 Joe Walker, 2010/11–2020/21
 Wal Walmsley, 1959/60
 Brendan Ward, 1986/87–1987/88
 David Warner, 2010/11
 John Warrington, 1973/74
 BJ Watling, 2004/05–2020/21
 Kyle Wealleans, 1988/89–1994/95
 Gareth West, 2002/03–2003/04
 Adam Wheater, 2012/13
 David White, 1979/80–1994/95
 Jeremy White, 1972/73–1973/74
 Kevin White, 1978/79
 Kane Williamson, 2007/08–2019/20
 Brad Wilson, 2004/05–2014/15
 Norm Wilson, 1957/58–1960/61
 Nicholas Winter, 2016/17
 John Wright, 1975/76–1983/84
 James Wright, 1958/59
 Mike Wright, 1972/73–1983/84
 Len Wyatt, 1953/54–1956/57

Y
 Bryan Young, 1983/84–1997/98
 Joseph Yovich, 1996/97–2012/13

Notes

References

Northern Districts